Antonello Eustachi (died 1544) was a Roman Catholic prelate who served as Bishop of Lesina (1540–1544).

Biography
On 16 April 1540, Antonello Eustachi was appointed during the papacy of Pope Paul III as Bishop of Lesina.
He served as Bishop of Lesina until his death in 1544.

See also 
Catholic Church in Italy

References 

Year of birth missing
1544 deaths
16th-century Italian Roman Catholic bishops
Bishops appointed by Pope Paul III